Flash Fearless Vs. the Zorg Women, Pts. 5 & 6 is a comic book hero idea put to music with Alice Cooper, Elkie Brooks, Black Oak Arkansas' Jim Dandy, the Who's John Entwistle and Keith Moon, Justin Hayward, Carmine Appice, Eddie Jobson, Nicky Hopkins, Kenney Jones, Thunderthighs, Bill Bruford, James Dewar and many others.

Track listing
 Trapped - 4:10
  I'm Flash - 3:09
  Country Cooking - 5:03
  What's Happening - 6:51
  Space Pirates - 3:13
  Sacrifice - 3:55
  Let's Go to the Chop - 2:41
  Supersnatch  Fearless Flash - 3:24
  Georgia Sycopator  Fearless Flash - 3:02
  Blast Off - 4:33
  Trapped - 1:24

Charts
Various Artists Original Studio Cast.

References

1975 albums
Alice Cooper albums
Chrysalis Records albums